The US Chamber Institute for Legal Reform (ILR), founded in 1998, is a separately incorporated affiliate of the United States Chamber of Commerce. The organization advocates for civil justice reform, commonly referred to as tort reform.

The president of the organization is Harold H. Kim, and the group's website says it is the "country's most influential and successful advocate for civil justice reform, both in the U.S. and abroad."

Stances on issues 
ILR advocates for a number of state and federal policy positions related to civil justice reform. These include policies to provide more transparency in the asbestos bankruptcy trust system, class-action lawsuit reform, spotlighting third-party litigation funding and lawsuit lending, reforms to the False Claims Act and Foreign Corrupt Practices Act, among others.

State Liability Rankings Study 
Every few years, ILR releases the results of a Harris Poll survey that ranks the 50 states, from best to worst, on their individual legal climates. ILR calls this the "Lawsuit Climate: Ranking the States" report."

The survey focuses on perceptions of the state liability system by asking respondents to grade the following elements:"
 Overall treatment of tort and contract litigation
 Having and enforcing meaningful venue requirements
 Treatment of class action suits and mass consolidation suits
 Damages
 Timeliness of summary judgment or dismissal
 Discovery
 Scientific and technical evidence
 Judges' impartiality
 Judges' competence
 Juries' fairness
The 2019 Lawsuit Climate Survey: Ranking the States is the 12th time The Harris Poll has conducted the survey since 2002 for the U.S. Chamber Institute for Legal Reform. The final results are based on interviews with a national sample of 1,307 in-house general counsel, senior litigators or attorneys, and other senior executives who are knowledgeable about litigation matters at public and private companies with annual revenue of at least $100 million., or 50th."

Faces of Lawsuit Abuse campaign 
Since 2007, ILR also has run a public education campaign it calls, "Faces of Lawsuit Abuse." This campaign features videos of small businesses, communities and families who have been sued, as well as videos and a regularly updated online poll that allows people to vote for the "Most Ridiculous Lawsuits."

At the end of each year, ILR releases the Top Ten Most Ridiculous Lawsuits of the year, which features the year's ten most popular stories based on polling data.

Criticisms 

Critics of ILR and other tort reform organizations argue that the organizations limit the access of ordinary citizens to be compensated for harms done to them by corporations through faulty products and/or harmful services. Critics argue that such interest groups do not promote judicial efficiency, legal ethics, or any other public purpose, but merely protect corporations from the consequences of their misdeeds.

Critics further argue in order to pursue their agenda, the ILR has created several newspapers around the country that present readers with biased, anti-victim accounts of cases and pro-“tort reform” commentary. These entities include: Northern California Record, Florida Record, Louisiana Record, and SE Texas Record among others.

References

External links
 
 Organizational Profile – National Center for Charitable Statistics (Urban Institute)
 "The asbestos bonanza". Washington Times. 9-Jan-2017.
 "2016's 10 most frivolous lawsuits, according to U.S. Chamber". Seattle Pi.
 "ILR study focuses on double-dipping in Virginia asbestos cases." Legal News Line. 15-Dec-2016.

Business organizations based in the United States
Legal organizations based in the United States
Organizations established in 1998
1998 establishments in the United States
Law reform in the United States